Sulcospira is a genus of freshwater snails which have an operculum, aquatic gastropod mollusks in the family Pachychilidae.

Distribution 
The distribution of this genus includes: Malaysia, China, Thailand, Indonesia, and Vietnam.

Species 

Species within the genus Sulcospira include:
 Sulcospira agrestis (Reeve, 1860)
 Sulcospira circumstriata (Metcalfe, 1851)
 Sulcospira collyra Köhler, Holford, Do & Ho, 2009
 Sulcospira dakrongensis Köhler, Holford, Do & Ho, 2009
 Sulcospira hainanensis (Brot, 1872)
 Sulcospira housei (I. Lea, 1856)
 Sulcospira infracostata (Mousson, 1849)
 Sulcospira kawaluensis Marwoto & Isnaningsih, 2012
 Sulcospira pisum (Brot, 1868)
 Sulcospira provisoria (Brot, 1884)
 Sulcospira quangtriensis Köhler, Holford, Do & Ho, 2009
 Sulcospira schmidti (Martens, 1908)
 Sulcospira sulcospira (Mousson, 1849) - type species of the genus Sulcospira
 Sulcospira testudinaria (von dem Busch, 1842)
 Sulcospira tonkiniana (Morlet, 1886) 
 Sulcospira tourannensis (Souleyet, 1852)
 Sulcospira vietnamensis Köhler, Holford, Do & Ho, 2009

References

External links 
 

Pachychilidae